Paul King may refer to:

Entertainment
Paul King (novelist) (1931–2014), pseudonym of American writer Donald Moffitt
Paul King (Mungo Jerry) (born 1948), British singer and guitarist with pop group Mungo Jerry
Paul King (VJ) (born 1960), Irish-born English singer, formerly with the group King, and a VJ
Paul King (director) (born 1978), British TV and film director, known for The Mighty Boosh
Paul King (entrepreneur) (born 1984), American chief executive of Hercules Networks
Paul King (screenwriter) (1926–1996), American producer and screenwriter

Sports
Paul King (cricketer) (born 1979), English cricketer
Paul King (rugby league) (born 1979), British rugby league footballer
Paul King (American football official), NFL official

See also
Ulmus 'Paul King', an elm tree cultivar